Covenant University (CU) is a private Christian university in Ota, Ogun State, Nigeria. It is affiliated with Living Faith Church Worldwide and is a member of the Association of Commonwealth Universities, Association of African Universities , and National Universities Commission. In 2019, Covenant University became the first Nigerian university to be ranked in the top 401-500 category of world universities by Times Higher Education.

History and governance
The process of founding Covenant University (CU) started in October 1999, one month after the dedication of Faith Tabernacle in Ota. The university is a product of the Liberation Commission and was established by the World Mission Agency and the Living Faith Church Worldwide. Covenant University opened on 21 October 2002 in Canaanland, Ota, with a Pentecostal Christian mission ethos. It was founded by David Oyedepo, the presiding Bishop of Living Faith Church Worldwide, who is chancellor of the university.

Pastor Abraham Ojeme was appointed pro-chancellor of the university on 23 September 2013.

Academic programmes and sports

Covenant University academic programmes run in four colleges: the College of Management and Social Sciences (CBSS), the College of Leadership Development Studies (CLDS), the College of Engineering (COE) and the College of Science and Technology (CST). Covenant University runs postgraduate programmes in the entire curriculum listed above. The university owns a stadium facility with a swimming pool and lawn tennis, table tennis, basketball and volleyball courts. Covenant University is one of the affiliated universities of the Nigeria Private University Games Association.

University Library (Centre for Learning Resources) 
Covenant University's Centre for Learning Resources, otherwise known as the university library, is situated between the female halls of residence, Dorcas hall and Esther hall areas of the campus, and directly opposite the university chapel. The total floor area of the complex is 11,300m. The library complex is an edifice with three floors, reputed to be one of the largest in Africa. It is designed as a glass structure. It is located amidst the college buildings, the university chapel and the halls of residence. It can accommodate up to 3000 readers and about 500 research staff and postgraduate students.

Open access publishing 
In January 2011 Covenant University adopted a policy that mandated all referred publications in journals, conferences and books to be deposited in the university open access repository. This applied to faculty and postgraduate students alike.

Secondary school 
Covenant University Secondary School was established on October 14, 2010, to cater for the young population within the university environment.

Notable alumni

 Baaj Adebule
 Teniola Aladese
 Dolapo 'LowlaDee' Adeleke, filmmaker
 Bimbo Ademoye, actress
 Anthonia Adenike Adeniji, associate professor of industrial relations and human resource management
 John Ajah, CEO Spinlet
 Ayo Akínwándé
 Nonso Amadi
 Ayoola Ayolola
 Ife Durosinmi-Etti, business executive and author. 
 Ishaya Bako, film director and screenwriter
 Nonso Bassey
 Bez, multi-instrumentalist and composer
 Chike, singer
 Ini Dima-Okojie, actress and style icon
Odunayo Eweniyi, business executive
 Gbubemi Fregene, chef
 Ric Hassani, musician
 Chiamaka Obuekwe
 Adebukola Oladipupo, actor
 Gloria Oloruntobi
 Mimi Onalaja
 Anny Robert, photographer
 Simi, lyricist and sound engineer
 Spellz, music producer (dropped out in his penultimate year)

Notable faculty members
 
 Anthonia Adenike Adeniji, associate professor of industrial relations and human resource management
 Professor Eric Maskin, 2007 Nobel laureate (visiting professor)
 Professor Ezekiel Adebiyi, first professor of Bioinformatics in West Africa; Vice-president (2007–2011) and secretary (2011-date) of African Society for Bioinformatics and Computational Biology
 Professor Emmanuel Maduagwu, professor of Biochemistry and fellow of the Nigerian Academy of Science and Royal Society of Chemistry.
 Professor Taiwo Abioye, former Deputy Vice Chancellor
 Professor Ekundayo Adeyinka Adeyemi, first professor of architecture in Nigeria and Sub-Saharan Africa
 Professor Sanjay Misra, Institution of Engineering and Technology premium award recipient.
 Professor Kayode Soremekun, former Dean, College of Development Studies.
 Professor Samuel Ibiyemi, former Dean, College of Science and Technology.

Vice Chancellors 
 Professor Bola Ayeni (May 2002 - September 2004) 
 Dr. Jonathan Aremu (2005) (Acting Vice chancellor) 
 Professor Aize Obayan (February 2005 – October 31, 2012) 
 Professor Charles Ayo (November 1, 2012 – July 2016) 
 Professor AAA Atayero (July 15, 2016 – September 22, 2020) 
 Professor Akan Williams (September 22, 2020 – November 10, 2020) (Acting Vice-Chancellor) 
Professor Abiodun Humphrey Adebayo (November 10, 2020 – Present)

Recent developments and achievements 

 Covenant University is a leading private institution in Nigeria based on number of prospective students/applicants that seeks to get admitted; Its admission requirements, cited scholarly journals and annual rankings.
 On September 26, 2018, it became the highest ranked Nigerian university in the world universities ranking of the Times Higher Education (THE). 
 Covenant was also recently selected as one of the Africa Centres of Excellence for Development Impact (ACE Impact). 
 Earlier in November, 2018, Covenant entered the Subject Rankings of the Times Higher Education (THE) for the first time in the Business and Economics subject category ranking 501+ globally. Furthermore, in the recently released Engineering subject ranking, Covenant emerged in the 501-600 category. 
 In January 2015, it was ranked as the best university in Nigeria according to Webometrics. A publication by Vanguard, that segregated universities in Nigeria into Grade A, B, etc. based on JAMB score ceiling; categorized Covenant University as a "Grade A" university. 
 The National Universities Commission in 2016, listed Covenant University as the best private school in Nigeria. In 2017, the university retained its position as Nigeria's best private institution according to the same government agency. 
 Again, in August 2017, Lagos Chamber of Commerce and Industry awarded Covenant University with the best private university in Nigeria award. These feat was also reported in 2013 and 2014.
 2013 & 2014: Best Private University in Nigeria 
 2014: Best Vice Chancellor of Private University in Nigeria.
 2014: The Centenary ICT Driven University of the Year.
 2014: The Best Private University in Nigeria 
 Covenant University has been statistically rated as the most preferred private university in Nigeria among university seekers since the public availability of Joint Admissions and Matriculation Board data in 2014. It was the most sought-after private school in 2014, 2015, 2016 and 2017.
 According to Elsevier, data from 2011 to 2015 show that Covenant University publications was rated number one in Wind power, Wind and turbine,  Corrosion inhibitors, Carbon steel; and the second best in trade, Remittance, Effect and housing; Residential satisfaction, satisfaction among all universities worldwide. Another report by Daily Independent newspaper which analyzed Elsevier Scival metrics showed that publications in Computer Science, Engineering, Business Management and Accounting from Covenant University ranked tops in Nigeria.
 In 2016, Africa Leadership Magazine listed Covenant University as one of the universities of excellence to be honoured in South Africa.
 At the Presidential Special Scholarship Scheme for Innovation and Development (PRESSID), which is an annual initiative by the Federal government of Nigeria to provide scholarship abroad to students that graduated with first class degrees from Nigerian universities, Covenant University had the highest number of students that scaled through the aptitude examination among all universities in Nigeria during the 2013, 2014 and 2015 academic sessions.
 A 2017 collaborative study by Stutern, Jobberman and BudgIT reveal that graduates from Covenant University are the "most employable" in Nigeria. The study was criticized by some stakeholders for not having a large sample size.
 Techcabal rated Covenant University as having the best software developers in Nigeria. The school was also listed as having one of the best five postgraduate schools in Nigeria by Nigeria Bulletin. In January 2018, a Covenant University student, Ubani Peculiar Chinaemerem was awarded the best marketing student by the National Institute of Marketing of Nigeria among all students in Nigerian universities.
 In 2018, Covenant University won the Nigerian round of the CFA Institute Research Challenge, defeating the University of Lagos and Obafemi Awolowo University to become Nigeria's first representative in the global competition. In 2018, Federal Ministry of Science and Technology awarded the school first position in innovative technology among all universities in Nigeria. The school was placed third in the 2017 edition.

Students' Organisation achievements 
Covenant was 2019 National Enactus Champion.
Covenant Enactus emerged second position at 2018 National Competition.
In 2017 Covenant University Enactus team emerged second best nationwide.

Criticisms
The university has received several criticisms and lawsuits in connection with its strict codes of conduct.

Further reading

References

 
Education in Ogun State
Educational institutions established in 2002
2002 establishments in Nigeria
Christian universities and colleges in Nigeria
Buildings and structures in Ogun State
Evangelical universities and colleges